was a Japanese electronic rock band from Chiba Prefecture. Negoto formed in 2007 when the members were high school students. In 2008, the band won a special jury prize at the 1st  which is a music festival features teen bands in Japan. The band debuted in 2010.

They are best known for the 2010 hit song "Loop" reached number 3 in Billboard Japan Hot 100, the 2011 hit song "Charon" reached number 6 in Billboard Japan Hot 100 and the 2012 hit song "sharp ♯" (from the anime series Mobile Suit Gundam AGE) reached number 11 in Billboard Japan Hot 100. The band's other anime theme contributions include Galilei Donna, Shimajirou to Kujira no Uta, and Gintama°.

Last tour and disbandment
On December 28, 2018, Negoto published a message on their official website stating that they will disband on July 20, 2019. They will embark on their last tour on May 28 and end on July 20.

Members 
  – vocals, keyboards
  – guitar
  – bass guitar
  – drums

Discography 

Studio albums
 ex Negoto (2011)
 5 (2013)
 VISION (2015)
 ETERNALBEAT (2017)
 SOAK (2017)

EPs and mini-albums
 Hello! "Z" (2010)
 Mercirou e.p. (2011)
 "Z"OOM (2014)
 Asymmetry e.p. (2016)

Singles
 Charon (2011)
 Sharp (2012)
 Lightdentity / Re:myend! (2012)
 nameless (2012)
 greatwall (2012)
 Tashikanauta (2013)
 Syncromanica (2013)
 Ammonite! / Tasogare No Rhapsody (2014)
 DESTINY (2015)
 DANCER IN THE HANABIRA (2017)
 Sora mo Toberuhazu / ALL RIGHT (2017)

References

External links
 
Sony Music official artist page 

Japanese electronic rock musical groups
Japanese alternative rock groups
Ki/oon Music artists
All-female bands
Musical groups established in 2007
Musical groups from Chiba Prefecture